
Gmina Jodłownik is a rural gmina (administrative district) in Limanowa County, Lesser Poland Voivodeship, in southern Poland.

Villages
Gmina Jodłownik contains the villages and settlements of Góra Świętego Jana, Janowice, Jodłownik, Kostrza, Krasne-Lasocice, Mstów, Pogorzany, Sadek, Słupia, Szczyrzyc, Szyk and Wilkowisko.

Neighbouring gminas
Gmina Jodłownik is bordered by the gminas of Dobra, Łapanów, Limanowa, Raciechowice, Tymbark and Wiśniowa.

References
 Polish official population figures 2006

Jodlownik
Limanowa County